Ivanišević is a Serbian and a Croatian surname. It may refer to:

Goran Ivanišević (born 1971), tennis player
Ivan Ivanišević (born 1977), chess player
Jovo Ivanišević (1861–1889), composer
Katica Ivanišević (born 1935), professor and politician
Miroslav Ivanišević (born 1956), politician
Tibor Ivanišević (born 1990), handball player

Serbian surnames
Croatian surnames
Surnames from given names